Armando Montano (October 10, 1928 – December 5, 2007) was an American politician who served in the New York State Assembly from the 77th district from 1969 to 1982.

References

1928 births
2007 deaths
Hispanic and Latino American state legislators in New York (state)
American politicians of Puerto Rican descent
Democratic Party members of the New York State Assembly
People from San Juan, Puerto Rico
20th-century American politicians